Christian Thierjung (born January 5, 1995) is an American soccer player who plays for California United Strikers in the National Independent Soccer Association.

Career

College career
Thierjung played four years of college soccer at the University of California, Berkeley between 2013 and 2016.

While at college, Thierjung appeared for Premier Development League sides OC Pateadores Blues and Burlingame Dragons.

Professional career
On January 17, 2017, Thierjung was selected in the third round (50th overall) of the 2017 MLS SuperDraft by San Jose Earthquakes. However, he wasn't signed by the club.

In April 2017, Thierjung signed with National Premier Soccer League side New York Cosmos B. He moved to United Soccer League's Tulsa Roughnecks on July 21, 2017. He made his debut for the Roughnecks on July 22, 2017, as an 80th-minute substitute against Phoenix Rising FC, and scored in the 85th minute to give them a 3-0 victory.

On December 21, 2017, it was announced that Thierjung would move to Reno 1868 FC ahead of their 2018 season.

References

1995 births
Living people
American soccer players
Association football wingers
Burlingame Dragons FC players
California Golden Bears men's soccer players
National Premier Soccer League players
New York Cosmos B players
OC Pateadores Blues players
People from Rancho Santa Margarita, California
Reno 1868 FC players
Soccer players from California
FC Tulsa players
USL Championship players
USL League Two players
National Independent Soccer Association players